James F. Geurts is an American former government official and retired United States Air Force colonel who most recently served as the official Performing the Duties of United States Under Secretary of the Navy.

Career 
Geurts previously served from 2017 to 2021 as Assistant Secretary of the Navy (Research, Development and Acquisition). Prior to that role, he served in the Senior Executive Service as Acquisition Executive for United States Special Operations Command, where he was responsible for all special operations forces research, development, acquisition, procurement, and logistics.

He previously served in the U.S. Special Operations Command as Deputy Director of Special Operations Research, Development and Acquisition Center, and as Commander of the Joint Acquisition Task Force Dragon. Geurts also served as Program Executive Officer for the Fixed Wing Aircraft at the U.S. Special Operations Command. He is a recipient of the Federal Executive of the Year Vanguard Award, Presidential Rank Award, William J. Perry Award, Defense Superior Service Medal, Legion of Merit, Defense Meritorious Service Medal with oak leaf cluster, Meritorious Service Medal, Air Force Commendation Medal, Joint Service Achievement Medal with oak leaf cluster, and Air Force Achievement Medal with oak leaf cluster.

Geurts was commissioned a United States Air Force officer after graduating from Lehigh University's ROTC program in 1987. While in the Air Force, he managed programs involving intercontinental ballistic missiles, surveillance platforms, tactical fighter aircraft, advanced avionics systems, stealth cruise missiles, training systems, and manned and unmanned special operations aircraft. In 2009, he retired from the Air Force as a colonel. Geurts was the driving force behind ThunderDrone and Sofwerx, two military-civilian idea incubators in Florida. These incubators helped develop the Tactical Assault Light Operator Suit, which is a robotic exoskeleton suit.

He stepped down from all government positions and formally retired in late August 2021.

External links 
 Biography at U.S. Air Force
 Biography at U.S. Navy

References

Air Force Institute of Technology alumni
Biden administration personnel
Lehigh University alumni
Living people
National Defense University alumni
Trump administration personnel
United States Air Force officers
United States Assistant Secretaries of the Navy
Year of birth missing (living people)